{{safesubst:#invoke:RfD|||month = March
|day = 18
|year = 2023
|time = 16:01
|timestamp = 20230318160159

|content=
REDIRECT Lynbrook_High_School

}}